Flabellina alternata is a species of sea slug, an aeolid nudibranch, a marine  gastropod mollusc in the family Flabellinidae.

Distribution
This species was described from Morro de Beados, Bahía de Corimba, Angola.

References

Flabellinidae
Gastropods described in 1998
Fauna of Angola